Dylan James Carlson (born October 23, 1998) is an American professional baseball outfielder for the St. Louis Cardinals of Major League Baseball (MLB).

Selected by the Cardinals in the first round of the 2016 MLB draft, Carlson became one of the top prospects in baseball before making his MLB debut in 2020. He became the team's starting right fielder in 2021 and was a finalist for National League Rookie of the Year.

Amateur career
Carlson attended Elk Grove High School in Elk Grove, California where he played baseball under his father, Jeff, and was teammates with Nick Madrigal, Rowdy Tellez, Dom Nunez, and Derek Hill. He began playing on the varsity team as a 14-year-old freshman. As a senior, he batted .407 with nine home runs and 40 RBIs in 36 games along with pitching to a 6–0 record with a 1.44 ERA.

Professional career

Draft and minor leagues
Despite not being considered or named a Top 200 prospect for the Major League Baseball (MLB) draft by MLB.com, Carlson was selected by the St. Louis Cardinals in the first round, 33rd overall, of the 2016 MLB draft. He rescinded his college commitment to California State University, Fullerton and agreed to a signing bonus of $1.35 million, which was $550,500 under the slot value.

Carlson made his professional debut that same year with the Gulf Coast League Cardinals, batting .251 with three home runs and 22 RBIs in 50 games. Carlson spent 2017 with the Peoria Chiefs where he slashed .240/.342/.347 with seven home runs and 42 RBIs in 115 games. He began the 2018 season with Peoria, and after batting .234 with two home runs and nine RBIs in 13 games, was promoted to the Palm Beach Cardinals. Carlson finished the year with Palm Beach, slashing .247/.345/.386 with nine home runs and 53 RBIs in 99 games.

Carlson began the 2019 season with the Springfield Cardinals. He was named a Texas League All-Star and participated in the Home Run Derby. In July, he represented the Cardinals in the 2019 All-Star Futures Game alongside Nolan Gorman. After slashing .281/.364/.518 with 21 home runs, 59 RBIs, and 18 stolen bases over 108 games with Springfield, he was promoted to the Memphis Redbirds in August. Following his promotion, Carlson was named the Texas League Player of the Year. He played in 18 games with Memphis, batting .361 with five home runs and nine RBIs. Over a total of 126 games between Springfield and Memphis, Carlson slashed .292/.372/.542 with 26 home runs, 68 RBIs, and 20 stolen bases. He was originally selected to play in the Arizona Fall League for the Glendale Desert Dogs following the season, but it was later announced he would not be participating.

St. Louis Cardinals (2020–present)
The Cardinals promoted Carlson to the major leagues on August 15, 2020, and he made his MLB debut that day against the Chicago White Sox. On August 23, 2020, he hit his first MLB career home run. He finished the 2020 season slashing .200/.252/.364 with three home runs and 16 RBIs over 35 games.

Carlson returned in 2021 as St. Louis' starting center fielder, taking over for the injured Harrison Bader. When Bader returned from the injured list, Carlson moved to right field. On April 7, 2021, he hit his first career grand slam against Zach Pop of the Miami Marlins at LoanDepot Park. Carlson finished the 2021 season with 542 at-bats over 149 games, slashing .266/.343/.437 with 18 home runs, 65 RBIs, and 31 doubles. He was a finalist for the National League Rookie of the Year Award, alongside Jonathan India and Trevor Rogers.

Carlson opened the 2022 season as the club's starting right fielder. In late May, he was placed on the injured list with a hamstring injury. He was activated in early June. Carlson hit the final of a record-tying four consecutive home runs between teammates on July 2, 2022, the 11th such occurrence in major league history.  At Citizens Bank Park in Philadelphia, Nolan Arenado, Nolan Gorman, Juan Yepez and Carlson all homered off Phillies starter Kyle Gibson with two outs in the first inning.  It was the first time that the Cardinals had accomplished the feat, and the first time that it occurred in the first inning. In early September, Carlson was placed on the injured list with a thumb sprain before being activated a little over a week later. Over 432 at-bats in 128 games, he slashed .236/.316/.380 with eight home runs, 42 RBIs, and thirty doubles.

Personal life
Carlson's younger brother, Tanner, plays college baseball at Long Beach State University.

References

External links

1998 births
Living people
Baseball players from California
Gulf Coast Cardinals players
Major League Baseball outfielders
Memphis Redbirds players
Palm Beach Cardinals players
Peoria Chiefs players
Sportspeople from Elk Grove, California
Springfield Cardinals players
St. Louis Cardinals players